Blue Stream is a major gas pipeline crossing the Black Sea.

Blue Stream may also refer to:

 Blue Stream (company) a local cable television and Internet provider in Florida
Blue Stream II, proposed pipeline, abandoned in 2014

See also
The Blue Stream, book